Peter Chan is a film director and producer.

Peter Chan may also refer to:

 Peter Chan Chi-kwan (born 1936), barrister-in-law for Hong Kong
 Peter Chan (businessman) (born 1959), Hong Kong businessman and former Feng shui geomancer
 Peter Chan (artist), video game and film concept artist